Oyne railway station is a former railway station serving the small village of Oyne, Aberdeenshire.

History 
Oyne station was built by the Great North of Scotland railway on its line from Aberdeen to Keith. Like most stations on the line, it was opened in 1854. It was closed like most intermediate stops on the line in 1968 by the Beeching cuts.

Previous services

References

Notes

Sources 
 
 

Disused railway stations in Aberdeenshire
Beeching closures in Scotland
Former Great North of Scotland Railway stations
Railway stations in Great Britain opened in 1854
Railway stations in Great Britain closed in 1968
1854 establishments in Scotland
1968 disestablishments in Scotland